Jean Arasanayagam (born Jean Solomons; 2 December 1931 – 30 July 2019) was a Sri Lankan poet and fiction writer. Although she wrote her books in English, they have been translated into German, French, Danish, Swedish and Japanese.

Her husband, Thiyagarajah Arasanayagam and their two daughters, Devasundari and Parvathi, all share the same passion for writing. Thiyagarajah won the Gratiaen Prize in 2016, while Parvathi is a published writer of fiction, short stories and poetry.

Life
Jean Lynette Christine Solomons was born on 2 December 1931 in Kandy, the daughter of Harry Daniel Solomons (1890–1981) and Charlotte Camille née Jansz (1889-1970), the youngest of three children. She was a Dutch Burgher – a term which referred to the official offspring of intermarriages between Dutchmen and women of the indigenous communities. She grew up and spent her life mostly in Kandy. She attended the Girls' High School, Kandy and graduated from the University of Peradeniya. She later obtained her MA in Linguistics at the University of Strathclyde in Glasgow, Scotland. Being a passionate, lovable teacher to thousands of students in many institutions in Sri Lanka, she was also a visiting Fellow at the Faculty of Arts, Exeter University. Jean was married to a Jaffna Tamil and often dealt with multiple cultures and traditions, which may have moulded her ethnic consciousness and identity.

While predominantly known as a poet, she was also a painter, who exhibited her work at Commonwealth exhibitions in London, Paris and at the Lionel Wendt Art Centre in Colombo. She died on 30 July 2019, aged 88, after a brief illness.

Dominant themes in poetry 
Dominant themes that are apparent in her writing of all genres, including poetry, short fiction, fiction and memoirs, are those of identity, heritage, displacement and ethnic violence.

A lot of her work dealt extensively with her sense of identity displacement as a Dutch Burgher in a post-colonial country. The Burghers in Sri Lanka were one of the smallest minorities, but also had a high social status in colonial Sri Lanka. After Independence, however, their numbers declined further and ‘in the cultural sphere, they suffered the worst alienation.’. Jean explores her Burgher ancestry in such an environment of linguistic and cultural marginalization, even when it often meant having to confront the exploitative nature of the Dutch period in Sri Lankan history. For instance, she refers to the brutality that occurred when the Dutch arrived in Sri Lanka, and the ways in which the locals were exploited, in the collection A Colonial Inheritance and Other Poems (1984).

Her marriage to a traditional Jaffna Tamil family further contributed to her sense of identity displacement. The Tamil community was already ‘very sensitized’ about its cultural and political claims’ and as a Burgher, she both became ‘a member of a community already othered by hegemonic nationalistic discourses’  and was seen as ‘alien’ by the Tamils themselves. Arasanayagam, thus, had to get accustomed to their exacting and uncompromising social customs and traditions as an outsider. This negotiation between two different identities is a focal point in her first two collections of poems, Kindura (1973) and Poems of Season Beginning and a Season Over (1977) and other later work, including Reddened Water Flows Clear and Shooting the Floricans.

Most critics ‘agree that 1983 was a significant event in her literary career, and that a marked note of urgency and political awareness emerges in her post-’83 writing.’  Her collection of Apocalypse 83 (1984) referred to the riots of July 1983, and articulated her ‘strong line of protest against anti-Tamil violence of post-Independence.’  Being married to a person of Tamil-Hindu background made her a target of Sinhala nationalistic forces during the events of Black July 1983. At the time, she resided in Kandy, Sri Lanka, and was a lecturer at a teachers’ college in the neighbouring town of Peradeniya. A mob set fire to a neighbour’s house and threatened to attack the Arasanayagams themselves, resulting in them fleeing their home, seeking shelter in the houses of neighbours till they were taken by the army to a refugee camp. Such an experience shaped her identity and thus, events of Black July, and other acts of violence witnessed in the country after it gained independence were themes explored in her writing.

She also brought to the forefront the suffering of women during the colonial period highlighting the patriarchal practices present at the time. For instance, in the poem Maardenhuis – The House of the Virgins Amsterdam/Kalpitiya, the narration of the experiences of Dutch female orphans who were brought to Sri Lanka to be sexual partners of Dutch colonisers, gives a voice to the voiceless, preventing that aspect of history from being forgotten.

Critical reception 
To the author, Katrina M. Powell, the poetry of Arasanayagam’s ‘uniquely links identity, documentation and alienation’. Reggie Siriwardene, the Sri Lankan poet and critic, described Arasanayagam’s work as being the voice of ‘our collective sense of horror and tragedy”  after her first-hand experience of the violence of the ethnic riots translated into her writing. Furthermore, Alka Nigam stated that “the poetry of Jean Arasanayagam in ‘mournful melodies’ struggles with both the inner and outer turmoil” agreeing with Arasanayagams’s own admission that the ‘[t]he crux of her poems is a life time’s search for an identity’. Agreeing with this is Melanie Murray who sees Arasanayagam’s poems as ‘engaging with issues of identity and territory by exploring her (colonial) past to come to grips with the present’. 

During a convocation at Bowdoin College where Arasanayagam's poetry forms part of the university curriculum, the then president, Barry Mills, appreciated her for her 'voice of conscience, of experience, of wisdom and of hope' and for having 'given generously of yourself in encouraging young writers, including students enrolled in the collegiate Sri Lankan education program.'

Awards and recognition 
Arasanayagam was an Honorary Fellow in the Creative Activities of the International Writing Programme at the University of Iowa (1990), a visiting fellow at the Faculty of Arts at the University of Exeter and international writer in residence for the University of Exeter and Southwest Arts in the UK (1994). In 2014 she received the Premchand Fellowship by the Sahitya Akademi of India. She was also the recipient of many awards during her lifetime. In 1984 she received the National Award for Literature, and in 2017 was awarded the Gratiaen Prize, for her collection of poetry, The Life of the Poet. That same year, she was awarded the Sahityarathana, for her lifetime contributions to Literature in Sri Lanka.

Death
Arasanayagam died on 30 July 2019 in Kandy.

Works
Past teacher of St. Anthony's College, Kandy

Poetry
Kindura (1973)
Poems of Season Beginning and a Season Over (1977)
Apocalypse '83 (1984)
The Cry of the Kite (1984) 
A Colonial Inheritance and Other Poems (1985)
Out of Our Prisons We Emerge (1987)
Trial by Terror (1987)
Reddened Waters Flow Clear (1991)
Shooting the Floricans (1993)
Nallur
ruined gopuram
mother-in-law
Fusillade

Prose
The Cry of the Kite (A collection of short stories) (Kandy, 1984)
The Outsider (Nagasaki University: Bulletin of the Faculty of Liberal Arts, 1989)
Fragments of a Journey (Colombo : WERC, 1992)
All is Burning (New Delhi : Penguin Books India, 1995)
Peacocks and Dreams (New Delhi : Navrang, 1996)

References

External links
Literary Encyclopedia page
 SAWNET: Bookshelf: Jean Arasanayagam

1931 births
2019 deaths
Alumni of Girls' High School, Kandy
Burgher poets
Burgher writers
People from Kandy
Sri Lankan novelists
Sri Lankan people of Dutch descent
Sri Lankan women poets
Women novelists
20th-century Sri Lankan writers
20th-century Sri Lankan women writers
21st-century Sri Lankan writers
21st-century Sri Lankan women writers
International Writing Program alumni
20th-century poets
21st-century poets